James Francis Hand (born 22 October 1986) is an Irish footballer. Hand played with Manor Farm, Carrick Rovers, Monaghan United and Belvedere, before signing for Huddersfield Town.

Career
Born in Drogheda, County Louth, Hand made his Town debut against Oldham Athletic on 7 April 2007, replacing Gary Taylor-Fletcher at half-time and was instrumental in the set-up of Luke Beckett's equaliser.

Hand has played for the Republic of Ireland national under-21 football team.

References

1986 births
Living people
People from Drogheda
Republic of Ireland association footballers
Republic of Ireland under-21 international footballers
Association football midfielders
Huddersfield Town A.F.C. players
Dundalk F.C. players
Newry City F.C. players
English Football League players
League of Ireland players
Belvedere F.C. players